Sherif Abdul Majeed, (born April 6, 1995) known by his stage name Maccasio, is a Ghanaian Hip hop, Hiplife, and Afropop recording Artist and Entrepreneur . He is from the Kingdom of Dagbon, in the Northern Region of Ghana. Maccasio raps and sings in his native language Dagbani with the ability to mix it with terms in English and Twi. He has performed on stages with artists such as Davido, Shatta Wale, Samini, Stonebwoy, Medikal and VVIP.

Musical career 

Maccasio realized his music talent at the age of 14. He raps mainly in his native language Dagbani with a blend of English, Hausa and Twi. His signature tune  is one of the most popular signature tune in the northern region. Maccasio has three albums to his credit.

Maccasio launched his debut album "Boussu" in March 2014. His second album, "Oshihila Nkpe" was launched in 2015 at the Picona Gardens.

His third studio album dubbed "Ninsala" was launched on 19 August 2017 at the Tamale Sports Stadium. Maccasio hosted Shatta Wale at the Tamale Stadium during his 'Too big concert' in Tamale, an event that saw the stadium filled to capacity.

Maccasio released his 4th album Zero to hero on 4 January 2019

Maccasio 5th album was released on 3 November 2022

Maccasio was the headline artist for the 'Northern explosion concert'on February 25, 2017. A pre-independence concert he hosted at the Accra sports stadium. The show saw performance from big international acts such as Sherifa Gunu, Kofi Kinaata Guru, Rudeboy, and Dr Cryme.

Maccasio pulled a crowd of nearly 20,000 fans to the Tamale Stadium during his peace concert in Tamale.

Maccasio filled up the Bokum boxing arena with total shut down concert on October 28, 2018, with a capacity of 5,000 in attendance.

Maccasio made another biggest history in the Ghana music by filling up the tamale sports stadium with a capacity of 20,000 seats while it was raining and people stood to watch the amazing rapper aka king of the north.

Maccasio filled the Bokum arena again with outstanding 6,000 fans with his kings concert on February 5, 2022.

Endorsements 
In 2016, Maccasio signed a one-year deal as the ambassador for Giant malt for the 3 northern regions of Ghana.

maccasio singned a five-year deal with as an ambassador for Mordern security consultant Ghana in Ghana

Maccasio signed ambassadorial deal with infinix mobile from 18 April to December 2022

Discography 
 2014: Bousu
 2015: O Shihila Nkpe
 2017: Ninsala
2020: Zero 2 Hero
2022 Glory

Major singles 
 Pad Featuring Morgan Produced by BlueBeatz
That Girl Featuring Patapaa Produced by Ojah Drumz
Lyrical Stamina Featuring Stone Brain Produced by Tizzle
Mma[MOM] Featuring Ahmed Adams Produced by MOG Mixed by Tizzle
 Dagomba Girl Featuring Mugeez (R2bees) Produced by MOG Mixed by PossiGee
 Too Big Featuring Shatta Wale Produced by Da Maker
 Inside Featuring Zeal (VVIP) Produced by DJ Breezy
 Work Featuring Kofi Kinaata Produced by KinDee
 69 Fans Produced by Blue Beatz
 Igwe Produced by Blue Beatz
 NINSALA prod by tizzle 
 make am ft shatta wale

Videography

Awards and nominations

West Africa Awards

|-

|-
|rowspan="1"|2019
|rowspan="1"|Himself
|rowspan="1"|Next Rated Artist Of The Year
||
|-

3RD TV Music Video Awards

|-

|-
|rowspan="1"|2019
|rowspan="1"|Best Afro Pop Video
|rowspan="1"|Make Am Ft Shatta Wale
||

Ghana Music Awards SA

|-

|-
|rowspan="1"|2019
|rowspan="1"|Himself
|rowspan="1"|Hip-life Artist Of The Year
||
|-
|rowspan="1"|2019
|rowspan="1"|Himself
|rowspan="1"|Best Rapper Of The Year
||

Ghana Music Awards UK

|-

|-
|rowspan="1"|2019
|rowspan="1"|Dagomba Girl
|Raggae/Dancehall Song of the Year
|
|-

Vodafone Ghana Music Awards

|-

|-
|rowspan="1"|2019
|rowspan="1"|Dagomba Girl
|Raggae/Dancehall Song of the Year
|
|-

3Music Awards

|-

|-
|rowspan="1"|2019
|rowspan="1"|Himself
|Fan Army of The Year
|
|-

Ghana Music Awards SA

|-

|-
|rowspan="1"|2018
|rowspan="1"|Himself
|PROMISING ARTIST OF THE YEAR
|
|-

3RD TV Music Video Awards

|-

|-
|rowspan="1"|2018
|rowspan="1"|Himself
|BEST AFRO POP VIDEO
|
|-

3Music Awards

|-

|-
|rowspan="1"|2018
|rowspan="1"|Himself
|Breakout Act of The Year
|
|-
|rowspan="1"|2018
|rowspan="1"|Himself
|Facebook Star of The Year
|
|-

People's Celebrity Awards

|-

|-
|rowspan="1"|2017
|rowspan="1"|Himself
|Favourite Social Media Personality
|
|-
|rowspan="1"|2017
|rowspan="1"|Himself
|Favourite Male Musician of the Year
|
|-
|rowspan="1"|2017
|rowspan="1"|Too Big
|Favourite Song of the Year
|
|-

Northern Entertainment Awards (NEA)

|-

|-
|rowspan="1"|2017
|rowspan="1"|Himself
|Overall Artiste of The Year
|
|-
|rowspan="1"|2017
|rowspan="1"|Himself
|Artiste Of The Year
|
|-
|rowspan="1"|2017
|rowspan="1"|Himself
|Best Rapper Of The Year
|
|-
|rowspan="1"|2017
|rowspan="1"|Ko Nin Neey
|Best Collaboration
|
|-

|rowspan="1"|2017
|rowspan="1"|Too Big
|Most Popular Song
|
|-

Northern Music Awards (NMA)

|-

|-
|rowspan="1"|2016
|rowspan="1"|Himself
|Highlife/Hiplife Artiste of the Year
|
|-
|rowspan="1"|2016
|rowspan="1"|Himself
|Best Rapper of the Year
|
|-
|rowspan="1"|2016
|rowspan="1"|Oshihilankpe
|Most Popular Song of the Year
|
|-

|rowspan="1"|2016
|rowspan="1"|Himself
|Artist of the Year
|
|-

References

External links
Facebook
Twitter
Instagram
YouTube



Living people
Ghanaian rappers
Dagomba people
Dagbani-language singers
Ghanaian Muslims
People from Tamale, Ghana
1995 births